The Armed Forces University – ESPE, which can also be translated as Polytechnical School of the Army, formerly called "Escuela Politécnica del Ejército"  is a higher education university in Sangolquí, Pichincha Province, Ecuador. 
Established on June 16, 1922, it originated from the Escuela de Oficiales Ingenieros (School of Engineer Officials), created by the Ecuadorian President José Luis Tamayo.

Currently, Armed Forces University – ESPE has several campuses across Ecuador. These are ESPE Sangolquí (Main Campus), IASA (El Prado estate), ESPE Latacunga Campus, and ESPE Santo Domingo Zoila Luz Estate.

There are several laboratories, courts, auditoriums, virtual classrooms, and a library in the main Polytechnic campus.

History

Universidad de las Fuerzas Armadas – ESPE was established on June 16 1922, as the Escuela de Oficiales Ingenieros, focusing on the training of army officers in military engineering. In 1936, it became the Escuela de Artillería e Ingenieros with the help of the Second Italian Military Mission, which refocused the institution on technical education, combining artillery science and engineering in the European style.  The university was renamed to Escuela Técnica de Ingenieros after World War II and allowed admission to civilian students starting in 1972. In December 1977, the university was renamed Escuela Politécnica del Ejército – ESPE by the Ecuadorian Congress.

On June 26 2013, the Superior Education Committee of Ecuador approved the construction of a new education center, merging the nation's three extent military higher educational institutions: Escuela Politécnica del Ejército – ESPE, Universidad Naval Rafael Morán Valverde – UNINAV and Instituto Tecnológico Superior Aeronáutico – ITSA. The combined institution was named Universidad de las Fuerzas Armadas – ESPE.

Organization

Departments 
Universidad de las Fuerzas Armadas is divided into Departments.

 Computer Sciences
 Electricity, Electronics and Telecommunications
 Languages
 Life Sciences and Agriculture 
 Security and Defense
 Exact Sciences
 Earth and Construction Sciences
 Economic, administrative and Commerce Sciences
 Mechanics and Energy Sciences
 Human and Social Sciences
 Distance Education Unit

References

External links 
  

 
Universities in Ecuador
Educational institutions established in 1922
 Buildings and structures in Pichincha Province
1922 establishments in Ecuador